Elizabeth Katz (born July 8, 1988) is an American cosplayer, actress, model and ex-pornographic actress.

Early life 
Katz was born on July 8, 1988 and raised in Randolph, New Jersey. She attributes her love of gaming to simply being how she was raised: "Growing up as a kid my father forced us to play table top games, miniature war-gaming... It was just something you did in my family".  She is "half-Jewish", and also celebrates Hanukkah and Passover.

Katz attended Randolph High School and cosplayed throughout her teens as a hobby.  After a brief career in the adult film industry under the pseudonym Risi Simms, Katz created a Facebook page under her real name and began posting her cosplay work. In 2014 Katz began playing video games live on Twitch.

Cosplay career 
Katz began cosplaying professionally after winning IGN’s Best Cosplay at WonderCon 2012.  In 2014, Katz began playing video games live on Twitch and posting gaming videos on her YouTube channel.

In 2013, Katz undertook a crowdfunding effort to fund a cosplay outfit, raising US$4,690, starting from her original goal of US$650. This prompted a debate in some circles on the use of crowdfunding for cosplay.

Playboy ranked Katz as the fifth sexiest cosplayer in 2014. FHM ranked her as the fourth sexiest cosplayer in 2016. Katz has since featured prominently at many cons and other events.

Katz has appeared in a number of Sam Macaroni's works and had over 1,200,000 Instagram followers as of June 2022.

Personal life 
Katz has three children. She first gave birth to a son when she was twenty. Twelve years after her first child, she became pregnant once more, after entering into a relationship with YouTuber H2O Delirious. She gave birth to a daughter in September 2020, and to another daughter in December 2021.

Filmography

Film

Television

Video games

Music videos

References

External links 
 
 
 

1988 births
Living people
Actresses from New Jersey
American film actresses
Female models from New Jersey
Cosplayers
People from Randolph, New Jersey
Randolph High School (New Jersey) alumni
American people of Jewish descent
21st-century American women